Johann Friedrich Endersch (25 October 1705 – 28 March 1769) was a German cartographer and mathematician. Endersch also held the title of Royal Mathematician to King Augustus III of Poland.

Life
Endersch was born in Dörnfeld an der Heide, Schwarzburg-Rudolstadt, Thuringia, but lived most of his life in Elbing (Elbląg), Royal Prussia in the Polish–Lithuanian Commonwealth.

In 1755 Endersch completed for Imperial Prince-Bishop Adam Stanisław Grabowski (Celsissimo ac Reverendissimo S. Rom. Imp. Principi Domino Adam Stanislao in Grabowo Grabowski Episcopo Warmiensi et Sambiesi, Terrarum Prussiae Praesidis ...) a map of Warmia titled Tabula Geographica Episcopatum Warmiensem in Prussia Exhibens. The map, detailing the towns of Warmia (Ermland), was commissioned for the court of Holy Roman Emperor Francis I.

Endersch also made a copper etching that depicted a galiot that had been built in Elbing in 1738 and was named D' Stadt Elbing (German for "City of Elbląg").

Notes

External links 
Map of Warmia by Endersch 

1705 births
1769 deaths
18th-century German mathematicians
German cartographers
People from Schwarzburg-Rudolstadt
Scientists from Thuringia
German emigrants to Poland
18th-century cartographers